The 1941 Georgia Bulldogs football team was an American football team that represented the University of Georgia as a member of the Southeastern Conference during the 1941 college football season. In their third season under head coach Wally Butts, the team compiled a 9–1–1 record (3–1–1 against SEC opponents), finished third in the SEC, outscored opponents by a total of 319 to 85, and defeated TCU in the 1942 Orange Bowl. The team played its home games at Sanford Stadium in Athens, Georgia, and at Ponce de Leon Park and Grant Field in Atlanta.

Halfback Frank Sinkwich was selected as a consensus first-team player on the 1941 All-America team. Early in the season, Sinkwich suffered a broken jaw and had to play with his jaw wired shut and a large jaw protector attached to his helmet. In the Orange Bowl game, Sinkwich rushed for 139 yards (including a 43-yard touchdown run) on 22 carries and completed nine of 13 passes for 245 yards and three touchdowns.

Five Georgia players were recognized by the Associated Press (AP) or United Press (UP) on the 1941 All-SEC football team: Sinkwich (AP-1, UP-1); end George Webb (AP-2); tackle Charles Sanders (AP-2); halfback Cliff Kimsey (AP-3); end George Poschner (AP-3); guard Walter Ruark (AP-3).

Schedule

References

Georgia
Georgia Bulldogs football seasons
Orange Bowl champion seasons
Georgia Bulldogs football